Hellish Flesh is a 1977 Brazilian horror film directed by José Mojica Marins. Marins is also known by his alter ego Zé do Caixão (in English, Coffin Joe).

Plot
Dr. George Medeiros is a brilliant scientist who does not find time for beautiful wife Rachel. She falls in love with Oliver, the best friend of her husband, and soon after the two plan to kill George and inherit his fortune. Benefiting from the distraction of her husband in the laboratory, Raquel throws acid on George's face, disfiguring it. As he recovers in the hospital, Raquel and Oliver spend all his money. After months in the hospital, Dr. George comes home with a plan for revenge in mind.

Cast 
 Cristina Andréia
 Lirio Bertelli
 Virgínia Camargo
 Michel Cohen
 Oswaldo De Souza
 Luely Figueiró
 José Mojica Marins
 Marisol Marins
 France Mary
 Jorge Peres
 João Paulo Ramalho (voice)
 Helena Ramos
 Mauro Russo

References

External links 
 Official film site 
 
 Inferno Carnal on Portal Heco de Cinema 

1977 films
1977 horror films
Brazilian horror films
Films directed by José Mojica Marins
1970s Portuguese-language films